Perth, the major city in Western Australia, has given rise to a number of notable performers in popular music. Some of the more famous performers include Kevin Parker, Troye Sivan, Rolf Harris, David Helfgott, Luke Steele and Tim Minchin. Notable artists in genres including rock, classical, and electronic music have lived in Perth.

History

Perth's isolation is problematic for many rising artists, as it increases costs associated with touring and promotion. For this reason, many artists leave Perth to improve their popularity, with varying degrees of success.

While most artists leave after achieving some popularity, some acclaimed performers only gained their fame after leaving, such as The Triffids and Pendulum.

Current

The Perth International Arts Festival bills itself as the largest and longest-lasting multi-arts festival in Australia. Music institutions include the West Australian Opera, West Australian Symphony Orchestra, and numerous choral groups.

Popular music
Perth is also home to a major local scene, which has produced nationally and internationally renowned artists such as Tame Impala, Troye Sivan, The Stems, Pond, Eskimo Joe, John Butler Trio, Gyroscope, Birds of Tokyo, Stella Donnelly, Abbe May, San Cisco, End of Fashion, Methyl Ethel, Turnstyle, Little Birdy, Jebediah, The Sleepy Jackson, Karnivool, Institut Polaire, The Panics, The Waifs, Knife Party, Psychedelic Porn Crumpets, and drum and bass acts like Pendulum.

Perth's hip hop scene has produced artists such as Drapht, Downsyde, MC Layla, Matty B, and Lo-Key Fu. Many of these artists are members of the Perth hip hop crew named Syllabolix. A majority of Perth's premier emcees are featured on the Obese Records label. This connection has seen several Perth artists feature in the recordings of other Australian acts, such as The Hilltop Hoods.

Many of Australia's critically acclaimed hardcore bands and punk bands originated from Perth, including The Victims, The Scientists, Extortion, Mach Pelican, Miles Away, Break Even, The Decline (band), Kerb and Rupture.

Classical
Perth is home to the West Australian Symphony Orchestra which performs a regular programme of orchestral music, usually from its base at the Perth Concert Hall; it also tours regional Western Australia. There are a large number of smaller professional, semi-professional and non-professional music groups and choral societies and choirs which perform in a variety of venues in and around Perth. Repertoire ranges from baroque to contemporary.

The West Australian Youth Music Association (or WAYMA), allows the youth of Perth to experience playing in a musical ensemble.  Acceptance is only granted to amateur student players under the age of 25 years and who are currently under instrumental tutelage.  The association runs a symphonic band, a flute choir, several choirs and four orchestras in total (two string orchestras and two symphony orchestras).

Venues

Major music venues in Perth include the Perth Concert Hall, Perth Arena, Challenge Stadium, the Metropolis Concert Clubs in Fremantle and Perth, Fremantle Arts Centre, Belvoir Amphitheatre and the Red Hill Auditorium. Large international acts often play outdoors, in stadium venues like the WACA cricket ground, Subiaco Oval, Members Equity Stadium or Perth Oval. Festival events are generally held at Claremont Showground or on the Perth Esplanade. The Supreme Court Gardens offer a large alternative outdoor venue, and have hosted such acts as David Bowie.

Many former venues have been demolished, including wartime dancehalls such as The Tearooms and The Pagoda Ballroom. The Perth Entertainment Centre hosted many international acts until it was closed in 2002 and demolished in 2012. It has been replaced with the Perth Arena. Similarly the Burswood Dome hosted many international acts until its demolition in 2013.
Other venues, such as The Bakery, The Raffles Hotel, the Hyde Park Hotel, The Grosvenor, The Stoned Crow, Fitzgerald's, The Red Parrot and The Old Melbourne Hotel, have closed as music venues but have been redeveloped as restaurants, public bars or apartments.

Current live music venues are predominantly located in the Fremantle and Perth/Northbridge entertainment districts. Many mid-sized venues host international and interstate acts. Some of these include the Fly-By-Night, The Newport Hotel, Mojos, the Rosemount Hotel and Amplifier/Capitol.

Many other smaller clubs and pubs present live music pop music predominantly, plus hip-hop, electronic music, cover bands and lesser-known local artists.

Publications

Local street press publications dedicated to the music and arts scene include X-Press Magazine and The Music (formerly known as Drum Media).

Many newspapers and magazines include sections on the Perth music scene, including the Wire Magazine, The West Australian's latest attempt at appealing to the youth market, and university publications such as Grok Magazine, Pelican and Metior.
Now defunct, there were many other music publications such as: Party Fears and Vortex, which often included a free seven-inch vinyl flexidisc stapled to the front, featuring local bands.

Radio
Perth is serviced by commercial radio stations Hit92.9, Nova 937, Mix 94.5, 96FM and 6iX, as well as public stations triple j and ABC Classic FM. Community broadcasters includes Radio Fremantle 107.9fm, Curtin FM, Heritage FM, RTR FM, KCRfm 102.5fm and Capital 101.7FM.

See also

List of musical acts from Western Australia
:Category:Music venues in Perth, Western Australia

References

Further reading
 The Town Crier : newsletter. Western Australian Folk Federation. 1972–current

External links
 
 X-Press
 Perth Music
 Perth Bands
 West Australian Music Industry Association
 Teknoscape – Perth Electronic Dance Music
 Drum Media Perth
 Cool Perth Nights
 Space Ship News – Perth Music News